Theodore Aaronios was one of the latter members of the Aaronios family in the 11th century Byzantine Empire.

Theodore served as governor of Taron.  He was killed in battle with the Turks in 1055.

References
 

1055 deaths
Byzantine governors
11th-century Byzantine military personnel
Byzantines killed in battle
Year of birth unknown
Byzantine people of the Byzantine–Seljuk wars
Theodore